Anomochilus monticola, the mountain pipe snake, or Kinabalu giant blind snake, is a species of snake in the Anomochilidae family. It is endemic to northern Borneo and only known from Kinabalu Park (Sabah, Malaysia). It is known from altitudes of  asl, characterized by montane forest. It presumably is fossorial.

Description
Anomochilus monticola grow to at least  in snout–vent length. Head is not distinct from the stout body. The eyes are small,  in diameter. Tail is short, just . The body has iridescent blue black ground colour. The dorsum is largely uniform in colour, but there is a pale horn coloured transverse bar across the snout. Ventrally, there are series of large pale horn coloured blotches. Chrome orange band encircles the tail base.

References

Anomochilidae
Endemic fauna of Borneo
Endemic fauna of Malaysia
Reptiles of Malaysia
Reptiles described in 2008
Reptiles of Borneo